The 1919 Middle Tennessee State Normal football team represented the Middle Tennessee State Normal School (now known as Middle Tennessee State University) during the 1919 college football season. The team captain was Rupert Smith.

Schedule

References

Middle Tennessee State Normal
Middle Tennessee Blue Raiders football seasons
College football undefeated seasons
Middle Tennessee State Normal football